Milica Djordjevic (born 1984 in Belgrade, Serbia), is a composer of contemporary classical music. She lives in Berlin.

Life and Works 
Djordjevic grew up in the Serbian capital, Belgrade. As a young child she hoped to become a concert pianist or a painter. She went to specialized music school and classical gymnasium. During teenage years she seriously considered a career in physics, theatre or art. Both painting and physics are still an important part of composer's life: her first impulse for sound representation, i.e. the notation, is a drawing and physics is inextricably linked to music.

Djordjevic finished her postgraduate studies at the Conservatoire de Strasbourg, where she studied with Ivan Fedele. She completed further studies at IRCAM and at the Hanns Eisler Academy of Music in Berlin, where she studied with Hanspeter Kyburz.

Djordjevic claims the first mature works in her oeuvre are The Firefly in a Jar (2007), for chamber orchestra, or MUK, for baritone, violin and prepared piano. MUK asks the baritone to use singing techniques used in old traditional Serbian music. Djordjević's music is described as "rough, often even raw in the gesture", as a "vital tonal language that refuses less harmony and beautiful sound than that it gives the experience of the elemental quite pleasurably: tones of the earth’s emanations." 

In 2015, she won the Belmont Prize for New Music from the Forberg-Schneider Foundation. In 2016, she won the Ernst von Siemens Composer's Prize. In 2020 she was awarded Claudio Abbado Composition Prize of the Berlin Philharmonic.

References

1984 births
Serbian composers
Living people